Gazzaniga is an Italian surname. Notable people with the surname include:

 Giuseppe Gazzaniga (1743–1818), Italian composer
 Marietta Gazzaniga (1824–1884), Italian soprano
 Michael Gazzaniga (born 1939), American neuroscientist
 Paulo Gazzaniga (born 1992), Argentinian football goalkeeper
 Pietro Maria Gazzaniga (1824–1884), Italian-Dominican theologian
 Silvio Gazzaniga (1921–2016), Italian sculptor

Italian-language surnames